Chandni Geetha, known mononymously as Chandni, is a Malayalam film actress best known for her work in the movie Celluloid, by the veteran director Kamal.

Early life
Chandni was born at Vadakkevila in Kollam city. She studied B.com at Fatima Mata National College. Chandni started her career as a participant of a music-based reality show on Mazhavil Manorama channel.

Filmography

Television
Chandni started her career as a participant of a music-based reality show on a Malayalam TV Channel, Mazhavil Manorama.

Malayalam television
 Indian Voice (Mazhavil Manorama)

References

Living people
Actresses from Kollam
Indian film actresses
People from Kollam district
Actresses in Malayalam cinema
21st-century Indian actresses
Year of birth missing (living people)